Daniel M. McCarthy (1888 – August 22, 1950) was an American Democratic politician and lawyer.

Born in Mankato, Kansas, McCarthy was a lawyer. He served in the Kansas State Senate in 1933 and 1935. He married Kathyrn O'Loughlin, who served in the United States House of Representatives.

Notes

External links

1888 births
1950 deaths
People from Mankato, Kansas
Kansas lawyers
Democratic Party Kansas state senators
20th-century American politicians
20th-century American lawyers